Lochead is a surname. Notable people with the surname include:

Bill Lochead (born 1954), Canadian ice hockey player
Daniel Cameron Lochead (1878–1946), Canadian politician
James Lochead (1923–1999), American figure skater
William Lochead (c. 1753 – 1815), Scottish surgeon and botanist